Francisco de Paula Vieira da Silva de Tovar e Nápoles, 11th Lord of the Honour of Molelos, 1st Baron and 1st Viscount of Molelos (1774–1852) was a Portuguese military officer and politician. He is best known for his role in the Portuguese invasion of the Banda Oriental, under the reign of king John VI, as well as for his active participation in Portugal's resistance against the invading troops of Napoleon (1807–1810) and, towards the end of his life, for his support for the Absolutist or Traditionalist faction during the Portuguese Civil War, whose ranks he led as a General.

In 1862, exiled king Miguel I honoured him posthumously by creating his only surviving grandson, António Vieira de Tovar de Magalhães e Albuquerque, 1st Count of Molelos. This title, however, was never legally validated, and his only daughter died an infant.

The vicomital title was given continuity by the descendants of António's great-aunt Josefa Vieira da Silva de Tovar.

See also 

Viscount of Molelos
Nápoles (family)
Honour (land)

References 

Serrão, Manuel. História de Portugal, Volume VII: A Instauração do Liberalismo (1807-1832)

1774 births
1848 deaths
Lords of Molelos
Barons of Molelos
Viscounts of Molelos
Portuguese military officers
Portuguese nobility
18th-century Portuguese people
19th-century Portuguese people
Military personnel of the Liberal Wars
Portuguese military commanders of the Napoleonic Wars